Mikhail Valerievich Logua ( born 27 July 1970) is an Abkhaz politician who has been Vice President of Abkhazia from 2011 until 2013. He previously served as Governor of Gulripshi District from 2006 until 2011.

On 23 May 2013, Apsnypress reported that Logua had renounced his membership of the political party United Abkhazia.

On 25 December 2013, Logua announced his resignation as Vice President for health reasons.

References

|-

1970 births
Living people
People from Sukhumi
Vice presidents of Abkhazia
Heads of Gulripshi District
Vice-presidential candidates in the 2011 Abkhazian presidential election